Lennie von Graevenitz (3 January 1935 – 9 September 2010) was a South African boxer. He competed in the men's bantamweight event at the 1952 Summer Olympics.

References

1935 births
2010 deaths
Bantamweight boxers
South African male boxers
Olympic boxers of South Africa
Boxers at the 1952 Summer Olympics
Boxers from Johannesburg